Whitley Neill Gin is a London Dry gin.

History
The brand was launched in 2005 and acquired by Halewood Wines & Spirits in 2009.

Distillation and Products
The gin is distilled by Johnny Neill, a descendant of Thomas Greenall, in an antique copper pot still.

The gin contains two African botanicals — Baobab Fruit and Cape Gooseberries as well as coriander seeds, sweet lemon, sweet orange, angelica root, cassia bark, florentine iris and juniper berries.

In 2021, the distillery moved to London and is now produced at a site named Halewood's City of London Distillery. The gin distillery was previously located just outside Birmingham in the West Midlands.

The gin sold in a distinctive matte black bottle with a stylised baobab tree on as its logo. It was redesigned in 2013.

In 2014, Whitley Neill has won a gold medal at the San Francisco Spirits Competition 2014 & was referenced in The Telegraph Online as one of the five best gins to buy.

Awards 
Gold in the San Francisco World Spirits Competition 2014
Gin Master, Super premium Category, The Drinks Business Gin Masters Competition 2013
Gold Medal - Super Premium Category - International Spirits Challenge 2013
International Wine & Spirit Trophy 2011: Gold Award Trophy. Best in Class.
Gold in the International Wine & Spirit Competition 2011: Best in Class
Gold in The Spirits Business Awards 2010: Premium Category
Double Gold in the San Francisco World Spirits Competition 2009
Gold in the International Review of Spirits by Beverage Testing Institute 2008
Double Gold medal San Francisco World Spirits Competition 2007
Gold Medal, "Best in Class" International Wine & Spirits Competition 2007
91 points, Gold Medal - rated "Exceptional" BTI Chicago 2007

References

External links 
 Whitley Neill website

Gins
Alcoholic drink brands
English distilled drinks